Jukun or Djugun or Dyugun may refer to:
Jukun people (West Africa)
Jukun Takum language
Jukun people (Australia)
Jukun language (disambiguation)
Djugun, Western Australia, suburb of Broome

Language and nationality disambiguation pages